Harran is a village in Grong municipality in Trøndelag county, Norway. The village is located along the river Namsen in the Namdalen valley. From 1923 until 1964, the village was the administrative centre of the old municipality of Harran.

The village lies along the European route E6 highway. Harran Station is located in the village along the Nordlandsbanen railway line. The station was opened in 1940, when the railway line was in use to Mosjøen. The station has been unmanned since 1989.  Harran Church is also located in the village of Harran, dating back to 1874.

References

External links
Harran Church

Villages in Trøndelag
Grong